1,3-Propanedisulfonic acid is a sulfonic acid containing two sulfonate units. Its salts are called eprodisates and have been evaluated as a protector of renal function in AA amyloidosis.

See also
Methanedisulfonic acid
Ethanedisulfonic acid

References

Sulfonic acids